Ebstein's anomaly is a congenital heart defect in which the septal and posterior leaflets of the tricuspid valve are displaced towards the apex of the right ventricle of the heart. It is classified as a critical congenital heart defect accounting for less than 1% of all congenital heart defects presenting in around 1 per 200,000 live births. Ebstein anomaly is the congenital heart lesion most commonly associated with supraventricular tachycardia.

Signs and symptoms
The annulus of the valve is still in the normal position. The valve leaflets, however, are to a varying degree, attached to the walls and septum of the right ventricle.  A subsequent "atrialization" of a portion of the morphologic right ventricle (which is then contiguous with the right atrium) is seen.  This causes the right atrium to be large and the anatomic right ventricle to be small in size.
 S3 heart sound
 S4 heart sound
 Triple or quadruple gallop due to widely split S1 and S2 sounds plus a loud S3 and/or S4
 Systolic murmur of tricuspid regurgitation = Holosystolic or early systolic murmur along the lower left sternal border depending on the severity of the regurgitation
 Right atrial hypertrophy
 Right ventricular conduction defects
 Wolff-Parkinson-White syndrome often accompanies

Related abnormalities

While Ebstein's anomaly is defined as the congenital displacement of the tricuspid valve towards the apex of the right ventricle, it is often associated with other abnormalities.

Anatomic abnormalities
Typically,  anatomic abnormalities of the tricuspid valve exist, with enlargement of the anterior leaflet of the valve. The other leaflets are described as being plastered to the endocardium.
Tethering the underlying ventricular wall is the most common for the posterior and septal leaflets, and sail-like anterior leaflets may be tethered to the RV free wall also.

About 50% of individuals with Ebstein's anomaly have an associated shunt between the right and left atria, either an atrial septal defect or a patent foramen ovale.

Electrophysiologic abnormalities
About 50% of individuals with Ebstein's anomaly have an accessory pathway with evidence of Wolff-Parkinson-White syndrome, secondary to the atrialized right ventricular tissue. This can lead to abnormal heart rhythms including atrioventricular re-entrant tachycardia.

Other abnormalities that can be seen on the ECG include:
 signs of right atrial enlargement or tall and broad 'Himalayan' P waves
 first degree atrioventricular block manifesting as a prolonged PR-interval
 low amplitude QRS complexes in the right precordial leads
 atypical right bundle branch block
 T wave inversion in V1-V4 and Q waves in V1-V4 and II, III and aVF.

Risk factors
An enlargement of the aorta may occur; an increased risk of abnormality is seen in babies of women taking lithium during the first trimester of pregnancy (though some have questioned this) and in those with Wolff-Parkinson-White syndrome.

Diagnosis
An echocardiogram is the most common and specific way to diagnose Ebstein’s anomaly because it effectively shows all 4 chambers of the heart, which displays the distance between the hinge point of the septal leaflet of the tricuspid valve and the anterior leaflet of the mitral valved (displacement index) to determine if the value is greater than 8mm/m2.

Treatment

Medication
Ebstein's cardio physiology typically presents as an (antidromic) AV reentrant tachycardia with associated pre-excitation. In this setting, the preferred medication treatment agent is procainamide. Since AV-blockade may promote conduction over the accessory pathway, drugs such as beta blockers, calcium channel blockers, and digoxin are contraindicated.

If atrial fibrillation with pre-excitation occurs, treatment options include procainamide, flecainide, propafenone, dofetilide, and ibutilide, since these medications slow conduction in the accessory pathway causing the tachycardia and should be administered before considering electrical cardioversion. Intravenous amiodarone may also convert atrial fibrillation and/or slow the ventricular response.

Surgery
The Canadian Cardiovascular Society (CCS) recommends surgical intervention for these indications:
 Limited exercise capacity (NYHA III-IV)
 Increasing heart size (cardiothoracic ratio greater than 65%)
 Important cyanosis (resting oxygen saturation less than 90% - level B)
 Severe tricuspid regurgitation with symptoms
 Transient ischemic attack or stroke
The CCS further recommends patients who require operation for Ebstein's anomaly should be operated on by congenital heart surgeons who have substantial specific experience and success with this operation. Every effort should be made to preserve the native tricuspid valve.

History
Ebstein's anomaly was named after Wilhelm Ebstein, who in 1866 described the heart of the 19-year-old patient Joseph Prescher. Joseph Prescher was cyanotic with dyspnea, palpitations, jugular venous distension, and cardiomegaly. At autopsy, “Ebstein described an enlarged and fenestrated anterior leaflet of the tricuspid valve.” In addition, “the posterior and septal leaflets were hypoplastic, thickened, and adherent to the right ventricle. There was also a thinned and dilated atrialized portion of the right ventricle, an enlarged right atrium, and a patent foramen ovale.”

References

External links 

Congenital heart defects